...Earth to the Dandy Warhols... is the sixth studio album by American rock band The Dandy Warhols. It was recorded in 2008 and released on May 19, 2008, the first album released on their self-founded Beat the World Records label after leaving Capitol Records in 2007.

Music critics were largely unappreciative of the album. "Mission Control" was released as the album's sole single on June 28.

Release 

...Earth to the Dandy Warhols... was released for download and streaming play on May 19, 2008, with the CD version of the album following on August 18. It is their first release on their self-founded Beat the World Records label, after leaving Capitol Records in 2007.

"Mission Control" was released as the sole single from the album on June 28. Music videos for all songs except "Wasp in the Lotus", "Love Song", "Beast of All Saints", "Valerie Yum" and "Musee du Nougat" were released.

Reception 

The album received a generally negative response from critics. While Robert Christgau gave it a two-star rating, signifying an "Honorable Mention", and AllMusic called it "a giant leap in the right direction" after the "uneven" Odditorium or Warlords of Mars, The Guardian calling it "achingly dull".

Track listing

Personnel 

The Dandy Warhols
 Courtney Taylor-Taylor – vocals, guitar and mixing (on "The Legend of the Last of the Outlaw Truckers")
 Peter Holmström – guitar
 Zia McCabe – keyboards
 Brent DeBoer – drums and backing vocals

Additional personnel
 Greg Gordon – engineering and mixing
 Jeremy Sherrer – engineering
 Jacob Martin Portrait – mixing
 Steve Marcusson – mastering

Charts

References

External links 

 ...Earth to the Dandy Warhols... at The Dandy Warhols' official website
 

The Dandy Warhols albums
2008 albums
Self-released albums